Maurice Allen (born November 20, 1981) is a World Long Drive Competitor, former two time number one ranked in the world. Allen competes in events that are sanctioned by the World Long Drive Association, which is owned by Golf Channel, part of the NBC Sports Group, and a division of Comcast.  The season-long schedule features events airing live on Golf Channel, culminating in the Volvik World Long Drive Championship in September.

Allen grew up in Pine Hills, Florida, a unincorporated subdivision in West Orlando, where he attended Maynard Evans High School. During his high school years, Allen played Varsity Football, Varsity Volleyball and excelled in Track & Field. Maurice initially attended the University of South Florida before transferring to FAMU. Maurice has one son.

Allen won the 2018 Volvik World Long Drive Championship on Sept. 5 at WinStar World Casino & Resort in Thackerville, Okla.  Allen blasted a 393-yard drive in the championship match against Justin Moose (Columbia, S.C.) to claim his first Volvik World Long Drive Championship title.

World Long Drive Career
Allen has been competing in long drive events around the world since 2010, where he essentially picked up golf for the first time at age 28.  Two years later, he set a then-Guinness world record for the fastest ball speed (211 mph) and in 2015 won three long drive events in Europe (Belgium, Italy, Sweden).  In 2016 Allen won events in the Czech Republic, The Netherlands, New Zealand and Slovenia.  Allen also won in New Zealand in 2017 and 2018, along with Japan in 2018.

Allen's breakout World Long Drive Association season came in 2017, when he captured championships at the Catawba Classic (North Caroline), Tennessee Shootout, and Mile HighShowdown (Colorado).  Allen also ascended to No. 1 in the World Long Drive rankings leading up to the 2017 Volvik World Long Drive Championship.

In 2018, Allen reached the quarterfinals in two events (Atlantic City Boardwalk Bash and Bluff City Shootout) but then capped off his season with his victory in the Open Division at the Volvik World Long Drive Championship in Thackerville.

Long Drive Stats 
9 time World Long Drive Finalist (2011, 2012, 2013, 2014, 2015, 2016, 2017, 2018, 2019)

2 time #1 ranked player in the world (2017, 2018)

Volvik World Long Drive Champion (2018)

World Long Drive Tour Chmpion (2017)

2 time Long Driver European Tour (LDET) Champion (2015, 2016)

Guinness World Record Ball Speed 211mph 3 wood (2012)

First person to hit a golf ball across Niagara Falls (2019)

26 Long Drive championships worldwide

Longest ball in competition 483 yards

Fastest ball speed 228 mph

Fastest swing speed 162 mph

Long Drive Results 
2011     

·      2nd place Heartland Classic                                          

·      3rd place Fall City Classic

·      4th place Shanks Shootout                                         

·      5th place Soderby Invatational

·      5th place Texas Shootout                                            

·      9th place Alidila Matchplay Championship

2012

·      Desert Launch Champion                                          

·      2nd place Rockwell Shootout

·      5th place Heartland Classic                                        

·      6th place Mile high Shootout

·      8th place Mesquite Shootout                                      

·      8th place Florida Classic

·      9th place Bulls Classic                                                                         

·      10th place Bash for Cash

·      10th place Tennessee Shootout                               

·      10th place Masters of Long Drive

2013 

·      Re/max Region 9 champion                                        

·      4th place Spanish Long Drive Championships

·      5th place Shanks Shootout                                          

·      8th place Dixie Classic

2014 

·      Re/max Long Drive Regional Champion                    

·      Conforming Club Series Champion

·      2nd place Cold Shootout                                               

·      5th place Buff City Shootout

·      5th place Dixie Classic                                                  

·      7th place Shark Attack Shootout

2015  

·      Volvik LDET European Tour Champion                            

·      Ranked #1 European Long Driver

·      9th in World Long Drive Championship                               

·      LDET Distance Record- 423 yards

·      1st place Sweden Long Drive Championships                     

·      1st place Belgium Long Drive Championships

·      1st place Italian Long Drive Championships               

·      2nd place Estonia Long Drive Championships

·      2nd place Estonia Long Drive Championships           

·      2nd place Slovenia Long Drive Championships

·      2nd place Hurricane Hitters Shootout                         

·      3rd place Mile High Shootout  

·      3rd place Masters of Long Drive                                

·      4th place Mesquite Long Drive Championships

·      5th place Spanish Long Drive Championships           

·      5th place Nebraska Long Drive Championships

·      5th place Dixie Classic                                               

·      9th place Tennessee Shootout

2016 

·      Volvik LDET European Tour Champion                             

·      Ranked #1 European Long Driver

·      9th in World Long Drive Championship   

·      1st place Netherlands Long Drive Championships              

·      1st place Czech Republic Long Drive Championships

·      1st place Slovenia Long Drive Championships                   

·      1st place New Zealand Long Drive Championships

·      2nd place Italian Long Drive Championships                      

·      2nd place Portugal Long Drive Championships

·      3rd place Spotlight city Shootout                                         

·      5th place Hungary Long Drive Championships

·      5th place East Coast Classic                                                 

·      5th place Denmark Long Drive Championships

·      6th place Bulls Invitational Shootout                                   

·      9th place Bluff City Shootout

2017 

·      WLD Tour Champion                                                         

·      Ranked #1 in the World

·      Tennessee Shootout Champion                                          

·      Mile High Showdown Champion

·      Catawba Classic Champion                                               

·      IGANZ International invitation Champion

·      3rd place Bluff City Shootout                                             

·      3rd place Clash in the Canyon

·      5th place East Coast Classic                                                

·      5th place Long Drive World Series Dubai

·      9th place Midwest Shootout                                               

·      9th place Long Drive World Series London

·      9th place Bash For Bash   

 ·      17th Volvik Long Drive World Championships

2018

·       World long drive champion

·       Japanese long drive champion

·       Pacific Rim champion

·       Battle in the burbs champion

·       Ak-Chin regional winner

·       3rd place Tennessee shootout

·       5th place Bash at the boardwalk

·       10th place Tennessee big shots

2019

·       First person to hit a ball across Niagara Falls

·       5th place Ak-chin Showdown in the sun

·       10th place Fort Jackson salute to military

·       10th place roc city rumble

·       17th place world championships

Niagara Falls 
On May 23, 2019 Allen became the first person to ever successful drive a golf ball over the horseshoe at Niagara Falls. It aired as a three part series August 1 , 2019 on Skratch as a part of Avis “is it drivable” campaign. This was done at Niagara Falls to promote Niagara as a golf destination.

Allen crossed the Falls on his 4th attempt with a ball that carried 393 yards and took a bounce and finished at 427 yard. The ball was hit from the visitors center on the Canadian side to the Niagara park on the American side.

Back in 2005 PGA tour player John Daly attempted to complete the task with over 5,000 onlookers at Table Rock to watch the Guinness World Record attempt. After over an hour of attempting Daly was unsuccessful at crossing The Falls

Unfortunately Allen’s attempt wasn’t recognized as a Guinness World record as Daly’s would have been, there also wasn’t much media attention on the accomplishment.

Viral moments with lots of "flair" 
Allen’s win in Denver at the 2017 Mile High Showdown came with a viral moment that introduced himself to many sports fans around the United States. His post-match interview and victory celebration included a flamboyant impersonation of professional wrestling superstar Ric Flair.

Another viral moment for Allen came during the 2017 Clash in the Canyon (Nevada) on Golf Channel, when he made the claim that World Long Drive competitors are ‘the best athletes on earth.’

Before World Long Drive 
A former sprinter, Allen initially walked on the football team as a wide receiver at the University of South Florida. He was set to compete in the U.S. Olympic trials in track and field in 2004 before tearing his hamstring.

Allen was a biology/chemistry double-major at Florida A&M University, where he earned his degree. He was working toward his doctorate in the chiropractic field at Life University before ultimately turning to World Long Drive on a full-time basis.
Maurice Allen has one child a son Malachi.

Community work 
Allen works with, Orlando Minority Youth Golf Association “OMYGA” in Orlando, FL. Allen is also a Boys & Girls Club ambassador of golf, along with an ambassador for The American Cancer Society Real Men Wear Pink program. Following his 2018 World Championship win, he was the subject of a proclamation from the Orange County (Orlando) mayor, who declared it “Maurice Allen day” in the community, in response to Allen’s decision to create four $5,000 scholarships at Evans High School in Orlando, Allen’s alma mater.

Between 2019 and 2020 Allen is responsible for raising $50,000 in scholarship money for graduating seniors at Evans High School and Dr. Philips High School; in Orlando, FL.

In 2020 Allen founded, Grow the Game Initiative.

Grow the Game Initiative 
The program sponsors three black women and three black men, per calendar year.  The selected athletes will be awarded $50,000 a year, to help with entry fees, travel expenses and equipment costs.  Each year six different athletes will be selected by the selection committee based on the six step application that all athletes must submit.

In 2020 there were two major fundraisers for this program. The auction of 3 sets of Black Lives Matter iron shafts 3-pw. There were only five sets of these shafts ever made. Each shaft was labeled with “Black Lives Matters” in bold yellow letters along with a fist on each side of the phrase. On the opposite side each shaft listed 6 names of victims that lost their lives due to social injustice.

The other fundraiser is a pledge system based on Allen’s participation in the Diamond Resorts Invitational golf tournament. The DRI is a LPGA tournament of Champions which also has a celebrity division which uses a stableford scoring system. The pledge system allows for corporations and individuals the opportunity to show their support with pledges that range from $1 to $500 per point.

References

American male golfers
American long drive golfers
1981 births
Living people
Golfers from Orlando, Florida
South Florida Bulls football players
Florida A&M University alumni